George Riley (April 2, 1843 – January 19, 1916) was a Canadian merchant and Liberal politician.

Born in St. Catharines, Canada West, the son of P. Riley, he was educated there and in Buffalo, New York. In 1885, Riley moved to British Columbia, becoming a merchant in Victoria. He married Mary N. Balfour in 1908.

He was chosen in a 1902 by-election to represent Victoria in the House of Commons of Canada, after the election of Edward Gawler Prior was voided. He was re-elected once, serving as an MP for Victoria City until 1906, when he resigned to allow William Templeman, a minister in Wilfrid Laurier's government, to take his seat. Shortly thereafter, Riley was appointed to the Senate.

Riley died in Victoria on January 19, 1916, and was buried in Ross Bay Cemetery.

References 

1843 births
1916 deaths
Liberal Party of Canada MPs
Members of the House of Commons of Canada from British Columbia
Politicians from St. Catharines
Liberal Party of Canada senators
Canadian senators from British Columbia